The Daisy Chain was an American all-female garage rock and psychedelic band from Fullerton, California who were active in the 1960s.  They are remembered for their album Straight or Lame, released on United International Records in 1968.

Career
The band was formed in Fullerton, California, which is part of Orange County, not far from Los Angeles.  Their lineup consisted of Shel Le, Camille, Rosemary Lane, and Dee Dee Lea, and their name reflected their interest in the burgeoning psychedelic sounds and "flower power" of the time.   In 1968, they released the album Straight or Lame for the United International label.   The band broke up shortly thereafter.   Rosemary Lane went on to sing backing vocals in Jackson Browne's band, but none of the other members remained active in music.

Later years
In the intervening years since their breakup, the Daisy Chain's work has come to the attention of garage rock and psychedelic enthusiasts.   In 2005 Sundazed Records reissued the Straight or Lame album on CD in its original mono mix, but with new liner notes including interviews with former band members.

Discography

Straight or Lame  (United International, 1967)

References

Psychedelic rock music groups from California
Garage rock groups from California
Musical groups established in 1967
Musical groups disestablished in 1968
All-female bands
History of women in California